Casey Inlet is an ice-filled inlet at the terminus of Casey Glacier, between Miller Point and Cape Walcott, on the east coast of Palmer Land. It was photographed from the air by Sir Hubert Wilkins in 1928, Lincoln Ellsworth in 1935 and the United States Antarctic Service in 1940. It was surveyed by the Falkland Islands Dependencies Survey in 1947. The inlet takes its name from Casey Glacier.

References
 

Inlets of Palmer Land